Kurt Erdmann (9 September 1901, in Hamburg – 30 September 1964, in Berlin) was a German art historian who specialized in Sasanian and Islamic Art. He is best known for his scientific work on the history of the Oriental rug, which he established as a subspecialty within his discipline. From 1958 to 1964, Erdmann served as the director of the Pergamon Museum, Berlin. He was one of the protagonists of the "Berlin School" of Islamic art history.

Life 
Erdmann started studying German literature in 1919, but soon developed a deeper interest in European art history. His PhD thesis in 1927, tutored by Erwin Panofsky, was about European architecture. He then went on to an apprenticeship at the State Museum in Berlin, where he was invited by Friedrich Sarre to join the work on his publication, together with Hermann Trenkwald, about ancient oriental carpets. Erdmann's scientific interest remained with oriental rugs throughout his entire career.

From 1958 until 1964, Erdmann was Head of the Museum of Islamic Art, Berlin, a department of the State Museums of Berlin, today the Pergamon Museum. He also worked as a professor at the universities of Berlin, Hamburg, Bonn, Cairo, and Istanbul (1951–1957). Erdmann was a member of the German Archaeological Institute. As Head of the Berlin Pergamon Museum, he was responsible for the reconstruction of the Berlin museum collections after World War II. The erection of the Berlin Wall  further disrupted the collections of the museums of the divided city. Erdmann worked on the planning for the new Museum of Islamic Art, then in Dahlem, West Berlin, until his death.

Work 
Kurt Erdmann was the fourth in a succession of directors of the Museum of Islamic Art, now the Pergamon Museum, Berlin. Established by Wilhelm von Bode, whose work was continued by Friedrich Sarre and Ernst Kühnel, they were the protagonists of the "Berlin School" of the History of Islamic Art. This scientific school developed the "terminus ante quem" dating method, based on reproductions of Oriental carpets in Renaissance painting.

Erdmann was the first to describe the "four social layers" of carpet production (nomadic, village, town and court manufacture). He recognized the traditions of village and nomad carpet designs as a distinct artistic tradition on its own, and described the process of stylization by which, over time, elaborate manufactory designs and patterns were integrated into the village and nomadic weaving traditions. Until Erdmann published his studies, art historians influenced by the nineteenth century "Vienna School" around Alois Riegl used to understand the process of pattern migration from court and town to village and nomad as a degeneration. Consequently, art historians focused more on the elaborate manufactory rug designs, which they saw as the most authentic. Erdmann was among the first to draw attention to the village, tribal, and nomadic rugs as a distinct and genuine form of artistic expression.

Erdmann also established the structural analysis as a means to determine the historical framework of rug weaving traditions within the Islamic world. The replacement of floral and foliate ornaments by geometrical designs, and the substitution of the earlier "infinite repeat" by large, centered compositions of ornaments, occurring during the turn between the fifteenth and sixteenth century was first described by Erdmann, and termed the "pattern", or "carpet design revolution".

While oriental rugs and Sasanian art were his two main fields of interest, Erdmann also worked on a variety of other subjects, including Achaemenid art, and Turkish roadside inn architecture. His work at the Berlin museum resulted in publications on groups and single works of pre-Islamic and Islamic art, including detailed descriptions of acquisitions made by the Berlin Museum. Erdmanns books are still cited by present-time textbooks on oriental rugs.

Major publications

English 
 Oriental Carpets: An Essay on their History. New York, 1960
 Carpets East Carpets West. Saudi Aramco World, 1965, p. 8–9.
 Seven Hundred Years of Oriental Carpets. London, 1970.
 The History of the Early Turkish Carpet. London, 1977

German 
 "Persische Teppiche der Safawidenzeit." Pantheon  Nr. 5, 1932, p. 227–231 
 "Die sasanidischen Jagdschalen. Untersuchungen zur Entwicklung der iranischen Edelmetallkunst unter den Sasaniden." Jahrbuch der Preussischen Kunstsammlungen  Nr. 57, 1936, p. 193–232. 
 "Eine unbekannte sasanidische Jagdschale." Jahrbuch der Preussischen Kunstsammlungen, Nr. 59, 1938, p. 209–217.
 Zur Chronologie der sasanidischen Jagdschalen.  ZDMG  Nr. 97, 1943, p. 239–283. 
 "Das Datum des Tāḳ-i Bustān." Ars Islamica Nr. 4, 1937, p. 79–97.
 "Zur Deutung der iranischen Felsreliefs."  Forschungen und Fortschritte Nr. 18, 1942, p. 209–211. 
 "Sasanidische Felsreliefs — Römische Historienreliefs." Antike und Abendland  Nr. 3, de Gruyter, 1948
 "Die Entwicklung der sassanidischen Krone." Ars Islamica  Nr. 15/16, 1951, p. 87–123
 Der türkische Teppich des 15. Jahrhunderts. Istanbul 1954. Written in German and Turkish
 with Hanna Erdmann: Das anatolische Karavansaray des 13. Jahrhunderts. Gebrüder Mann, Berlin 1976
 "Die universalgeschichtliche Stellung der sasanidischen Kunst." Saeculum  Nr.1, 1950, p. 508–534
 Die Kunst Irans: Zur Zeit der Sasaniden. Florian Kupferberg, Berlin 1943; 2nd ed. Kupferberg Verlag, Mainz 1969. 
 "Persepolis: Daten und Deutungen." MDOG zu Berlin 92, 1960, p. 31–47.
 "Die Keramik von Afrasiyab." Berliner Museen Nr. 63, 1942, p. 18–28; 
 "Islamische Bergkristallarbeiten." Jahrbuch der Preussischen Kunstsammlungen  Nr. 61, 1940, p. 125–146;
 "Neue islamische Bergkristalle." Ars Orientalis  Nr. 3, 1959, p. 201–205 
 "Keramische Erwerbungen der Islamischen Abteilung 1958–1960." Berliner Museen,  Nr. 10, 1961, p. 6–15;
 "Neuerworbene Gläser der Islamischen Abteilung 1958–1961." Berliner Museen, 11, 1961,  p. 31–41
 Orientalische Teppiche aus vier Jahrhunderten. Ausstellung im Museum für Kunst und Gewerbe, Hamburg, 22. August bis 22. Oktober 1950. Hamburg 1950.
 Arabische Schriftzeichen als Ornamente in der abendländischen Kunst des Mittelalters. Abhandlungen der Akademie der Wissenschaften und der Literatur in Mainz. Geistes- und sozialwissenschaftliche Klasse. Jahrgang 1953. Nr. 9. p. 467–513.
 Der orientalische Knüpfteppich: Versuch einer Darstellung seiner Geschichte.  Verlag Ernst Wasmuth, Tübingen 1955. 
 Der türkische Teppich des 15. Jahrhunderts. Istanbul 1957.
 Europa und der Orientteppich. Verlag, F. Kupferberg, Berlin/Mainz 1962.
 with Peter W. Meister: Kaukasische Teppiche. Exhibition catalogue Museum für Kunsthandwerk, Frankfurt 1962.
 Siebenhundert Jahre Orientteppich: Zu seiner Geschichte und Erforschung. Hanna Erdmann, ed., Bussesche Verlagshandlung, Herford 1966. 
 Iranische Kunst in deutschen Museen. Hanna Erdmann (ed. posthumously), F. Steiner, Wiesbaden 1967.

References 

1901 births
1964 deaths
Writers from Berlin
German orientalists
German art historians
German male non-fiction writers
Historians of Islamic art